The Young Nationals is the youth division of the National Party of Australia, with membership open to those between 15 and 35 years of age. Young Nationals also have full party membership, and partake in state and federal conferences with equal rights to members of the senior party. They are active in National Party campaigning during all state and federal elections. It was first formed in Queensland in 1957, with other states following in subsequent years.

The movement is predominantly organised on the state division level, with each state organising its own events and policy as well as electing its own executive. In 2007 the Queensland Division of the Liberal Party of Australia and the Queensland National Party merged to become the Liberal National Party of Queensland (A division of the Federal Liberal Party and an affiliate of the Federal National Party). As part of this merger process, the Queensland Young Liberals and the Queensland Young Nationals were merged to become the Young Liberal National Party (Young LNP). The Young LNP is effectively the Queensland division of both the federal Young Liberals and the federal Young Nationals, and is the largest division of each of these movements. The federal executive of the Young Nationals comprises members elected from delegations from each affiliated state Young Nationals organisation, and the President of each affiliate. Policy can also be adopted by the movement's federal body. These policies are often then advocated by the Federal Young Nationals on the floor of the Federal Council of the National Party of Australia, as well as in representations made directly to members of parliament.

Political impact

Politically, the Young Nationals have had an increasingly significant impact on overall National Party policy and machinations from the mid-2000s onwards. Young Nationals notably changed the party platform to oppose any form of mandatory ISP-level internet censorship in 2010 and have also expressed strong federalist sentiments, having spearheaded a push to abolish the national curriculum. In 2015 the NSW division of the Young Nationals also voted on a motion to support same-sex marriage and free votes on the issue. The movement has also been one of the stronger elements in the National Party that has expressed support for voluntary student unionism (VSU), eventually persuading Senator Fiona Nash to ditch the parliamentary party's opposition to VSU.

Current federal executive

Past presidents

Criticism and Controversy

Whilst serving as NSW Young Nationals chairman, Jessica Price-Purnell and two other NSW Young Nationals staffers reportedly embarked on an 'emotional' rampage inflicting substantial damage on the party's Orange campaign office during the 2016 Orange state by-election, which included a hole being punctured in the wall, with party state director Nathan Quigley expressing concern for the mental health of the three women, all of whom admitted responsibility for the vandalism and paid compensation for the damage.

In 2018, it was revealed that the NSW Young Nationals had been infiltrated by a number of neo-Nazis and other far-right extremists. Senior Party figures, including Federal Leader Michael McCormack denounced these attempts, stating that "The Nationals will not tolerate extremism or the politics of hate. People found to engage with such radicalism are not welcome in our party". The leader of the NSW Nationals, John Barilaro, also denounced racism and fascism within the party.

As a result of these revelations, the NSW National Party terminated the memberships of 19 members. The expelled members were found to have held links to a number of far-right organisation including the New Guard (not to be confused with the 1930s New Guard), the Lads Society, Antipodean Resistance, Squadron 88, and the Dingoes.

References

External links
Young Nationals
Queensland Division
National Party of Australia

Nationals
National Party of Australia
International Young Democrat Union